Tadepalle mandal is one of the 57 mandals in Guntur district of the Indian state of Andhra Pradesh. It is under the administration of Tenali revenue division and the headquarters are located at Tadepalle town. The mandal is situated on the banks of Krishna River, bounded by Thullur and Mangalagiri mandals.   from the mandal are under the jurisdiction of Andhra Pradesh Capital City.

Demographics 

 census, the mandal had a population of 99,428. The total population constitute, 49,662 males and 49,766 females —a sex ratio of 1002 females per 1000 males. 10,456 children are in the age group of 0–6 years, of which 5,336 are boys and 5,120 are girls. The average literacy rate stands at 75.06% with 66,781 literates.

Administration 
The three villages namely, Undavalli, Penumaka, a portion of Tadepalle municipality covering Nulakapet, Dolas Nagar etc. forms part of the new Amaravati and the mandal is a part of Andhra Pradesh capital region, under the jurisdiction of APCRDA. The mandal is under the control of a tahsildar and the present tahsildar is M.Sivaramakrishna. Tadepalle mandals one of the 3 mandals under Mangalagiri (Assembly constituency), which in turn represents Guntur (Lok Sabha constituency) of Andhra Pradesh.

Villages Lists

 census, the mandal has 9 settlements, which includes 2 towns, 1 out growth and 6 villages. Tadepalle (M) and Vaddeswaram (CT) are the two towns and Undavalli (OG) is the out growth to Tadepalle (M). Tadepalle (OG) is fully included in Tadepalle (M), while Vaddeswaram village is included in Vaddeswaram (CT). Undavalli (Rural) is fully included in Undavalli (OG).

The settlements in the mandal are listed below:

Notes
(M) denotes a Municipality
(CT) denotes a Census town
(Corp) denotes a Municipal Corporation
(OG) denotes an Out Growth

Education 

The mandal plays a major role in education for the rural students of the nearby villages. The primary and secondary school education is imparted by government, aided and private schools, under the School Education Department of the state. As per the school information report for the academic year 2015–16, the mandal has more than 11,466 students enrolled in over 71 schools.

See also 
 List of mandals in Andhra Pradesh
 Villages in Tadepalle mandal

References

Mandals in Guntur district